Sir John Salusbury Salusbury-Trelawny, 9th Baronet (2 June 1816 – 4 August 1885), was a British Liberal politician.

Life
Born at Harewood on 2 June 1816 to Patience Christian Carpenter and Sir William Salusbury-Trelawny, the 8th Baronet of Trelawny. He was educated at Westminster School and Trinity College. In 1824, Trelawny married Harriet Jane Tremayne, an author and the daughter of John Hearle Tremayne.

In 1840, Trelawny was appointed Deputy-lieutenant of Cornwall and captain of the Cornwall Rangers; subsequently commanding the 2nd Cornwall Rifles Militia. In 1841 he was called to the bar, but never practiced and, in the same year, unsuccessfully contested Cornwall East Parliament Constituency as a Liberal. Salusbury-Trelawny sat as Member of Parliament for Tavistock between 1843 and 1852 and 1857 and 1865 and for Cornwall East between 1868 and 1874. He succeeded his father to the baronet in 1856 and retired from parliament in 1874 due to "increasing infirmities".

References

External links

 
 

Salusbury-Trelawny, Sir John, 9th Baronet
Salusbury-Trelawny, Sir John, 9th Baronet
Salusbury-Trelawny, Sir John, 9th Baronet
Members of the Parliament of the United Kingdom for Tavistock
Members of the Parliament of the United Kingdom for constituencies in Cornwall
UK MPs 1841–1847
UK MPs 1847–1852
UK MPs 1857–1859
UK MPs 1859–1865
UK MPs 1868–1874
People educated at Westminster School, London